(The foreign gaze or life is a fart in a lantern) is a book by German Nobel Prize-winning author Herta Müller. It was first published in 1999. The book has received praise for its persuasiveness and its ability to explain why her Romanian past influences her writing style.

References 

1999 German novels
Works by Herta Müller
German-language novels